Paul Nash (born 10 July 1943) is a Jamaican former swimmer who competed at the 1966 and 1970 Commonwealth Games as well as the 1968 Olympics. He has also represented his country at water-polo. He was named Jamaica Sportsperson of the year in 1969. He is the father of West Indian cricketer Brendan Nash.

References

1943 births
Living people
Sportspeople from Kingston, Jamaica
Jamaican male water polo players
Jamaican male swimmers
Olympic swimmers of Jamaica
Swimmers at the 1968 Summer Olympics
Swimmers at the 1966 British Empire and Commonwealth Games
Swimmers at the 1970 British Commonwealth Games
Commonwealth Games competitors for Jamaica
20th-century Jamaican people
21st-century Jamaican people